Borl Castle is an imposing medieval castle above the banks of the Drava northeast of the main settlement in Dolane, Slovenia. It probably dates to the 12th century with 15th- and 17th-century additions. Some wall paintings, sculpture, and internal furnishings survive. In the Second World War, between 1941 and 1943, the castle served as a Gestapo prison. At first the castle stables and later the castle itself were used to imprison, interrogate, and torture suspects. In 1956, a memorial room was opened and a commemorative plaque was unveiled at the castle. It has been protected as a cultural monument of national significance.

References

Castles in Styria (Slovenia)
Cultural monuments of Slovenia